New Era for Democracy (NTD) is a political party in Burkina Faso.

History
The NTD was established on 13 March 2015 by former Minister of Urban Development Vincent Dabilgou. In the 2015 general elections it received 2.2% of the vote, winning three of the 127 seats in the National Assembly, one by proportional representation (taken by Emmanuel Lankoande) and two in the constituency vote (Larba Ousmane Lankouande in Gnagna Province and Issa Barry in Yagha Province).

References

2015 establishments in Burkina Faso
Political parties established in 2015
Political parties in Burkina Faso
Social democratic parties in Burkina Faso